Don Neilson is a Canadian country music artist. Neilson recorded three studio albums for Epic Records. He charted twelve singles on the Canadian country music charts, of which the highest was the No. 9-peaking "You're My Hometown" in 1993. Neilson was nominated for Best Country Male Vocalist at the Juno Awards in 1993 and 1996.

Discography

Albums

Singles

References

Canadian male singer-songwriters
Canadian country singer-songwriters
Living people
Musicians from Toronto
Year of birth missing (living people)